E123 may refer to:
 Amaranth (dye) or E123, a food additive
 Element 123, a predicted chemical element; see Extended periodic table § Superactinides 
 European route E123, a road in central Asia
 E.123, an ITU-T recommendation
 E-123 Omega, a recurring character in Sonic the Hedgehog games